Civitavecchia (meaning "ancient town") is a city and comune of the Metropolitan City of Rome in the central Italian region of Lazio. The harbour is formed by two piers and a breakwater, on which stands a lighthouse. Civitavecchia had a population of around 53,000 .

History

The modern city was built over a pre-existing Etruscan settlement.

The harbour was constructed by the Emperor Trajan at the beginning of the 2nd century. The first occurrence of the name Centum Cellae is from a letter by Pliny the Younger (AD 107). The origin of the name is disputed: it has been suggested that it could refer to the centum ("hundred") halls of the villa of the emperor. The modern harbour works rest on the ancient foundations. Remains of an aqueduct and other Roman buildings are preserved, and the imperial family had a villa here.

In the early Middle Ages (530s), Centumcellae was a Byzantine stronghold. It became part of the Papal States in 728. As the port was raided by the Saracens in 813–814,  828, 846 and finally in 876, a new settlement in a more secure place was therefore built by order of Pope Leo VII as soon as 854. In the meantime, however, the inhabitants returned to the old town by the shore in 889 and rebuilt it, giving it the name Civitas Vetus. The Popes gave the settlement as a fief to several local lords, including the Count Ranieri of Civitacastellana and the Abbey of Farfa, and the Di Vico, who held Centumcellae in 1431. In that year, pope Eugene IV sent an army under cardinal Giovanni Vitelleschi and several condottieri (Niccolò Fortebraccio, Ranuccio Farnese and Menicuccio dell'Aquila among them) to recapture the place, which, after the payment of 4,000 florins, became thenceforth a full Papal possession, led by a vicar and a treasurer.

The place became a free port under Pope Innocent XII in 1696 and by the modern era was the main port of Rome. The French Empire occupied it in 1806. On 16 April 1859 the Rome and Civitavecchia Rail Road was opened for service.

The Papal troops opened the gates of the fortress to the Italian general Nino Bixio in 1870. This permanently removed the port from papal control.

During World War II, the Allies launched several bombing raids against Civitavecchia, which damaged the city and inflicted several civilian casualties. On June 27, 1944, two American soldiers from the 379th Port Battalion, Fred A. McMurray and Louis Till, allegedly raped two Italian women in Civitavecchia and murdered a third. McMurray and Till were subsequently both executed by the United States Army by hanging five months later.

Economy
Civitavecchia is today a major cruise and ferry port, the main starting point for sea connection from central Italy to Sardinia, Sicily, Tunis and Barcelona. Fishing has a secondary importance.

The city is also the seat of two thermal power stations. The conversion of one of them to coal has raised the population's protests, as it is feared it could create heavy pollution.

Main sights
The massive Forte Michelangelo was first commissioned from Donato Bramante by Pope Julius II, to defend the port of Rome. The upper part of the "maschio" tower, however, was designed by Michelangelo, whose name is generally applied to the fortress. Pius IV added a convict prison, and the arsenal, designed by Bernini, was built by Alexander VII. North of the city at Ficoncella are the Terme Taurine baths frequented by Romans and still popular with the Civitavecchiesi. The modern name stems from the common fig plants among the various pools. And also next to the town is the location of the cruise ship docks. All major cruise lines start and end their cruises at this location, and others stop for shore excursion days that allow guests to see Rome and Vatican sights, which are ninety minutes away.

Geography

Climate
Civitavecchia experiences a hot-summer Mediterranean climate (Köppen climate classification Csa).

Transport

The Port of Civitavecchia, also known as "Port of Rome", is an important hub for the maritime transport in Italy, for goods and passengers. Part of the "Motorways of the Sea", it is linked to several Mediterranean ports and represents one of the main links between Italian mainland to Sardinia.

Civitavecchia railway station, opened in 1859, is the western terminus of the Rome–Civitavecchia railway, which forms part of the Pisa–Livorno–Rome railway.
A short line linking the town center to the harbour survived until the early 2000s. It counted two stations: Civitavecchia Marittima, serving the port, and Civitavecchia Viale della Vittoria.

Civitavecchia is served by the A12, an unconnected motorway linking Rome to Genoa and by the State highway SS1 Via Aurelia, which also links the two stretches. The town is also interested by a project regarding a new motorway, the Civitavecchia-Venice or New Romea, nowadays completed as a dual carriageway between Viterbo and Ravenna (via Terni, Perugia and Cesena) and commonly known in Italy as the Orte-Ravenna.

Education
The commune has multiple preschools, primary schools, junior high schools, and high schools. Polo Universitario di Civitavecchia is located in the city.

Twin towns and sister cities
Civitavecchia is twinned with:

  Amelia, Italy
  Bethlehem, Palestinian Authority, since 2000
  Ishinomaki, Japan
  Nantong, China

People
 Manuele Blasi (b. 1980), football player
 Silvio Branco (b. 1966), professional boxer
 Andrea Casali (1705–1784), Rococo painter
 Alessio De Sio (1968), journalist, city mayor from 2001 to 2005, director of communication of  "Hitachi" Rail Italy ex "AnsaldoBreda"
 Raffaele Giammaria (b. 1977), racing driver
 Pasquale Lattanzi (b. 1950), former football player
 Oscar Lini (1928-2016), football player
 Ermanno Palmieri (1921-1982), football player
 Giancarlo Peris (b. 1941), former track athlete
 Roberto Petito (b. 1971), road bicycle racer
 Giulio Saraudi (1938–2005), boxer
 Eugenio Scalfari (b. 1924), journalist, founder of la Repubblica
 Emiliano Sciarra (b. 1971), game designer
 Roldano Simeoni (b. 1948), former water polo player
 Vittorio Tamagnini (1910–1981), boxer

See also
Civitavecchia Calcio
Civitavecchia di Arpino
 Civitavecchia, Cachar district, Assam, India (spelt as "Chibita Bichia" by the locals).

References

External links

  
 Civitavecchia Port 
  Port of Rome
 Images of Fort Michelangelo
 Civitavecchia "The port of Rome" Guide

 
Coastal towns in Lazio
Mediterranean port cities and towns in Italy
Renaissance sites in the Lazio
Roman harbors in Italy
Roman sites in Lazio